"Dandelion" is a song by Swedish DJ duo Galantis and American singer, songwriter and producer Jvke. It was released on 8 January 2021 via Big Beat Records. It describes "a story of fleeting love."

Background
Galantis live-streamed on Instagram with Jvke, and announced the collaboration. In an interview, Galantis said the song "came about after Jvke requested to hop on a Galantis Instagram Live. I recognized him from TikTok and I asked him what he was up to. He said he was working on an idea for a song and started to sing it for me. I really loved the vibe, and he asked if I was down to work on it together. We ended up sending it back and forth, and it became this natural organic collaboration with no real plan or goal. The past year has really changed how we make music and work with other artists, with negative circumstances actually opening doors to unlikely opportunities."

Composition
The song is written in the key of G major, with a tempo of 118 beats per minute.

Critical reception
Niko Sani of edm.com described that the song "[is] a hypnotic, pop-infused anthem that's reminiscent of what longtime listeners fell in love with on the duo's debut album Pharmacy. Lewis Partington of We Rave You praised: "The low-key house-infused track is a perfect winter warmer to bring a bit of heat into a cold morning."

Lyric video
An accompanying lyric video was released on 9 January 2021. It shows series of "pastel flowers and backdrops", Jvke "dances in various scenes throughout the video."

Charts

Weekly charts

Year-end charts

Release history

References

2021 singles
2021 songs
Galantis songs
Songs written by Christian Karlsson (DJ)
Warner Music Group singles
Atlantic Records singles